Vrh pri Fari is a small village in the hills above the left bank of the Kolpa River in the Kostel in southern Slovenia. The area is part of the traditional region of Lower Carniola and is now included in the Southeast Slovenia Statistical Region.

Name
The name of the settlement was changed from Vrh to Vrh pri Fari in 1953. In the past the German name was Werch.

Church
The local church, built on a promontory overlooking the Kolpa Valley northeast of the settlement, is dedicated to Saint Nicholas (also known locally as sveti Mikula) and belongs to the Parish of Fara pri Kočevju. It dates to the 18th century.

References

External links
Vrh pri Fari on Geopedia

Populated places in the Municipality of Kostel